The Journal of Oral and Maxillofacial Pathology is a peer-reviewed open access medical journal published on behalf of the Indian Association of Oral and Maxillofacial Pathology. The journal publishes articles on the subject of dentistry, oral pathology, and maxillofacial surgery.

Abstracting and indexing 
The journal is abstracted and indexedin:
 Abstracts on Hygiene and Communicable Diseases
 CAB Abstracts
 EBSCO databases
 Expanded Academic ASAP
 Global Health
 ProQuest
 Scopus

External links 
 

Open access journals
English-language journals
Biannual journals
Dentistry journals
Medknow Publications academic journals
Publications established in 1997
Academic journals associated with learned and professional societies